Semt Garajı previously Semt is a railway station in İzmir. The station is served and owned by İZBAN. The current station was built between 2006–09 and opened on 30 August 2010.

Bus connections
ESHOT
 90 Halkapınar Metro - Gaziemir
 152 Konak - Gaziemir
 200 Mavişehir Aktarma - Havaalanı 
 887 Konak - Sarnıç Aktarma
 910 Konak - Gaziemir

References

Railway stations in İzmir Province
Railway stations opened in 1970
1970 establishments in Turkey
Gaziemir District